The s-bot is a small (15 cm) differential wheeled (with additional tracks) mobile robot developed at the LIS (Laboratory of Intelligent Systems) at the EPFL in Lausanne, Switzerland between 2001 and 2004. Targeted to swarm robotics, a field of artificial intelligence, it was developed within the Swarm-bots project, a Future and Emerging Technologies project coordinated by Prof. Marco Dorigo. Built by a small team of engineers (Francesco Mondada, André Guignard, Michael Bonani and Stéphane Magnenat) of the group of Prof. Dario Floreano and with the help of student projects, it is considered at the time of completion as one of the most complex and featured robots ever for its size. The s-bot was ranked on position 39 in the list of “The 50 Best Robots Ever” (fiction or real) by the Wired magazine in 2006.

Purpose and use of the s-bot 
This is a research robot, aimed at studying teamwork and inter-robot communication. To do this, the s-bots have several special abilities:
 Using their gripper (red in the photos), they can connect. Then they can, for instance, pass over gap and steps where a single robot would have failed.
 Using their integrated force sensor, they can coordinate to retrieve an object to a certain location  without the use of explicit communication. This is the way ants  bring preys to the nest.
Of course, all other sensors and actuators, also found on other robots, can be used to do teamwork such as food foraging.

Technical details

General 
 12 cm diameter
 15 cm height
 660 g
 2 LiIon batteries
 1 hour autonomy moving

Control 
 400 MHz custom XScale CPU board, 64 MB of RAM, 32 MB of flash memory
 12 distributed PIC microcontroller for low-level handling
 Custom Linux port running Familiar
 Wi-Fi

Actuators 
 2 treels
 turret rotation
 rigid gripper elevation
 rigid gripper
 3 axis side arm
 side arm gripper

Sensors 
 15 infrared sensors around the turret
 4 infrared sensors below the robot
 position sensors on all degrees of freedom except gripper
 force and speed sensors on all major degrees of freedom
 2 humiditiy sensors
 2 temperature sensors
 8 ambient light sensors around the turret
 4 accelerometers, which allow three-dimensional orientation
 1 640×480 camera sensor. Custom optic based on spherical mirror provides omnidirectional vision
 4 microphones
 2 axis structure deformation sensors
 optical barrier in grippers

LEDS 
 8 × RGB Light-emitting diodes around the turret
 red Light-emitting diodes in grippers

Special abilities 
S-bots can connect to other s-bots to create a bigger structure known as the swarm-bot. To do so, they attach together using their rigid gripper and ring. An s-bot has sufficient force to lift another one.

Integrated software 
The s-bot features a custom Linux port running the Familiar Linux distribution. All sensors and actuators are easily accessible through a simple C API.

References 

Notes

 Mondada, F., Guignard, A., Bonani, M., Bär, D., Lauria, M. and Floreano, D. (2003) SWARM-BOT: From Concept to Implementation. In Proceedings of the International Conference on Intelligent Robots and Systems 2003, IEEE Press. pp. 1626–1631. PDF BibTeX
 Mondada, F., Pettinaro, G. C., Guignard, A., Kwee, I., Floreano, D., Deneubourg, J.-L., Nolfi, S. and Gambardella, L.M., Dorigo, M. (2004) SWARM-BOT: a New Distributed Robotic Concept. Autonomous Robots, special Issue on Swarm Robotics, Volume 17, Issue 2-3, September - November 2004, Pages 193 - 221. PDF BibTeX
 Marco Dorigo, V. Trianni, E. Sahin, T. H. Labella, R. Gross, G. Baldassarre, S. Nolfi, J.-L. Deneubourg, F. Mondada, D. Floreano & L. M. Gambardella (2004). Evolving Self-Organizing Behaviors for a Swarm-bot. Autonomous Robots, 17 (2–3): 223–245. PDF BibTex
 Peer-reviewed scientific publication record
 General public press coverage

External links 
 Swarm-bots project homepage - The project in which the s-bot was developed.
 Future and Emerging Technologies - The IST program in which the swarm-bots project takes place.
 Information Society Technologies - The European Union research activity in which the FET program takes place.
 LIS - The lab where the s-bot was developed.
 Swarmbots page at LIS - Pictures and video of the s-bot

Hobbyist robots
Differential wheeled robots
2004 robots
Robots of Switzerland
Multi-robot systems
Tracked robots
Micro robots